Didier Delsalle (born May 6, 1957, in Aix-en-Provence, France) is a fighter pilot and helicopter test pilot. On May 14, 2005, he became the first (and only) person to land a helicopter, the Eurocopter AS350 Squirrel, on the  summit of Mount Everest.

Career 

Didier Delsalle joined the French Air Force in 1979 as a fighter pilot. Two years later he became a helicopter pilot, participating in search and rescue operations for the next ten years. Delsalle then worked for five years as a test pilot and instructor at the EPNER test pilot school in Istres, France. Delsalle was then hired by Eurocopter, the world's largest helicopter supplier and a subsidiary of the European Aeronautic Defence and Space Company, as chief test pilot responsible for small helicopters of the single-engine family, and later for the larger NH90 helicopters that were being developed (now in service) for numerous armed forces.

Mount Everest summit landing 

On May 14, 2005, at 07:08 NPT in the early morning (01:23 UTC), Delsalle set the world record for highest altitude landing of a helicopter when his Eurocopter AS350 Squirrel touched down on the 8,848 m (29,029 ft) summit of Mount Everest. The flight and the summit landing were recorded by a multitude of cameras and other equipment to validate the record. After sitting on top of the world for 3 minutes and 50 seconds, Delsalle lifted off and returned to the Tenzing-Hillary Airport at Lukla, Nepal.

Delsalle had to find areas of downdrafts and updrafts to complete the flight, stating: "I found an updraft so strong that I could rise up with almost no power."

Delsalle repeated the Everest summit landing the next day, May 15, 2005, to prove that the previous day had not been simple luck. Conditions the second day were much more difficult, but Delsalle chose not to wait any longer so as not to squander the opportunity for 'conventional' climbers waiting to summit Everest during the limited good weather conditions available in May.

World records for helicopter flight 

 Record of highest take-off, from the summit of Mount Everest, set May 14, 2005.

References

External links 
 Official report by Eurocopter
 Official pictures of the accomplishment of May 14, 2005, on Eurocopter's website.
 , .

1957 births
Living people
Helicopter pilots
French aviation record holders
French test pilots
Rotorcraft flight record holders